Ouled Aissa, Boumerdès is a town and commune in Boumerdès Province, Algeria. According to the 1998 census it has a population of 6,773.

History
 First Battle of the Issers (1837)

Notable people

References

Communes of Boumerdès Province
Cities in Algeria
Algeria